Derby USD 260, also known as Derby Public Schools, is a public unified school district headquartered in Derby, Kansas, United States.  The district includes the communities of Derby, Oaklawn-Sunview, McConnell Air Force Base, small southern parts of Wichita, and nearby rural areas. One school, Wineteer elementary, has an address for McConnell Air Force Base housing, however, there is an entrance in a residential neighborhood on the south side of Pawnee.

Schools
The school district operates the following schools:

High school
 Derby High School (Panthers)

Middle schools
 Derby Middle School (Bulldogs)
 Derby North Middle School (Falcons)

Elementary schools
 Cooper
 Derby Hills
 El Paso
 Oaklawn
 Park Hill
 Swaney
 Tanglewood
 Wineteer
 Stone Creek

See also
 Kansas State Department of Education
 Kansas State High School Activities Association
 List of high schools in Kansas
 List of unified school districts in Kansas

References

External links
 

School districts in Kansas
Education in Sedgwick County, Kansas